Emmanuel "Manu" Payet (born 22 December 1975) is a French comedian, actor, filmmaker and radio host.

Filmography

As actor

Voice work

Animated films
2006: Ice Age: The Meltdown: French voice of Lone Gunslinger Vulture
2008: Kung Fu Panda: French voice of  Po
2011: Kung Fu Panda 2: French voice of  Po
2013: Boule & Bill: French voice of  Po

External links

1975 births
French male film actors
French comedians
People from Saint-Denis, Réunion
Living people
21st-century French male actors
French film directors
French male screenwriters
French male television actors
French television presenters
French radio presenters